"Out There" is a song from the 1996 Disney animated film The Hunchback of Notre Dame. Unofficially, it consists of the two songs "Stay In Here" and "Out There". In the stage musical version, Frollo's "Stay In Here" section was expanded into its own song entitled "Sanctuary".

Production
Alan Menken's demo of the song put more emphasis on the "Stay In Here" theme of Quasimodo's monstrous features and Judge Claude Frollo's manipulation to keep him inside the cathedral.

In the stage musical version, the song is reprised at the very end, when he realizes that to a certain degree Frollo was right - that the world is cruel and wicked. But he also realizes that it is joyous and kind as well, and that it is the only world we've got so we must accept it, highs and lows included.

Synopsis
At this point in the film, Quasimodo wants to attend the Feast of Fools, but has never been allowed out of Notre Dame's bell tower before. His master Frollo tells him the outside world will treat him like a monster and says for his own sake he must stay where he is. After Frollo leaves, Quasimodo laments about what it would be like out in the real world, and pictures a romanticised version.

Composition
The song actually consists of two separate sections, centering upon the themes of entrapment and escape. Frollo's "Stay In Here" and Quasimodo's "Out There" juxtapose each other, and express the motivations behind both characters and their relationship to each other.

Critical reception
Den of Geek! noted "We’re already talking about just how dark the song 'Hellfire' goes, but there’s also the earlier duet in 'Out There' between Frollo and Quasimodo...It’s hardly High School Musical, is it?" Filmtracks.com wrote "The character song 'Out There' opens with a frighteningly sinister conversational interaction between Frollo and Quasimodo before the latter performs his compelling cry for identity with flourishing and redemptive orchestral accompaniment. Tom Hulce's voice, especially compared to Tony Jay, is appropriately light."

References

1990s ballads
Pop ballads
Songs from The Hunchback of Notre Dame (1996 film)
1996 songs
Disney Renaissance songs
Songs with music by Alan Menken
Songs written by Stephen Schwartz (composer)
Tony Jay songs
Male vocal duets
Song recordings produced by Alan Menken